Langston is a name of English origin.

Langston may also refer to:

Places
 Langston, Alabama, United States
 Langston, Oklahoma, United States

Schools
 John Mercer Langston School, listed on the National Register of Historic Places in Washington, D.C.
 Langston University, a public university in Langston, Oklahoma, United States

See also
 Looking for Langston, a 1989 film
 Langston Terrace Dwellings, listed on the National Register of Historic Places in Washington, D.C.
 Langston Hughes (disambiguation)
 Langston railway station, a former station, the area in Hampshire it served is now spelt Langstone
 Langstone (disambiguation)